Amphion is an unincorporated community in Atascosa County, in the U.S. state of Texas. According to the Handbook of Texas, the community had a population of 26 in 2000. It is located within the San Antonio metropolitan area.

History
Amphion was settled in the late 1880s and had a post office from 1881 to 1916. It served as the first county seat of Atascosa County. Sometime before the start of the 20th century, a Masonic lodge was established in the community. The community had a general store and two cotton gins operating sometime before 1887. In 1896, the population was reported as 100 and gained a hotel and a church. Amphion's decline began in 1909 when the Artesian Belt Railroad (from Macdona to Simmons City) bypassed it in favor of Jourdanton. The general store was the only business in the community in 1914 and also had a population of 100 during that year. In the 1940s, Amphion still had a cemetery and a few dwellings, and by 1956 it was described as a ghost town. In the late 1960s, only the cemetery and a few buildings remained, and the community was listed on county maps. In 2000, the population was twenty-six.

A replica of the county's first courthouse in Amphion is located across the street from the current one in Jourdanton. It was said to have been built near the site of a planned county seat named Navatasco in 1857. The origin of the community's name is unknown but was thought to be named after a figure in Greek mythology. It sits within a  ranch by José Antonio Navarro, who signed the Texas Declaration of Independence. The community also had a blacksmith shop and tannery in operation. Two men named Roy Jenkins and Frank Lozano donated the land for a local cemetery around 1870. The earliest gravesite was of a woman named Laura Underwood, but there is also a grave that was placed in 1800 for a boy who was said to be killed by Native Americans. It also contains the graves of two American Civil War soldiers. The cemetery is not listed on county maps, but it is surrounded by four other cemeteries.

The soil series known as "Amphion clay loam", classed as a fine, mixed, superactive, hyperthermic Pachic Paleustoll, is named after the town.

Geography

Education
Amphion had a summer normal school established sometime before 1900, possibly in 1896. By 1904, the local public school had 72 students and two teachers. The number of students enrolled in it declined to 54 in 1914 and was still in operation in the 1940s. Today, the community is served by the Jourdanton Independent School District.

References 

Unincorporated communities in Atascosa County, Texas
Unincorporated communities in Texas
Greater San Antonio